The Odde Ice Center is a 1,600-seat multipurpose arena located in Aberdeen, South Dakota on the Brown County Fairgrounds.  Built in 1980, it is home to the Aberdeen Wings of the North American Hockey League.

Currently, expansion of the arena is underway on the arena's south side; it would include storage room for the rink boards, locker rooms for youth hockey teams, offices for the Wings, larger locker rooms for the Wings, an exercise/training room, and suites above the team benches which would expand the total capacity to 1,750.  The expansion is set to be completed by September 2013.

References

External links
Brown County Fairgrounds
Odde Ice Center - Aberdeen Hockey Association
Odde Ice Center Expansion Plans - Aberdeen Wings

Indoor arenas in South Dakota
Indoor ice hockey venues in the United States
Buildings and structures in Aberdeen, South Dakota
Sports venues in South Dakota
North American Hockey League
Tourist attractions in Brown County, South Dakota